Alejandro Luis Castellanos (born August 4, 1986) is an American former professional baseball outfielder. He played in Major League Baseball (MLB) for the Los Angeles Dodgers, and in Nippon Professional Baseball (NPB) for the Yomiuri Giants.

Career

College
He attended Belmont Abbey College, where he hit .390 with a Division II leading 31 doubles in 2008 to earn All-Region honors. Was also an All-American and All-Region selection as a Freshman. He was drafted by the St. Louis Cardinals in the 10th round of the 2008 MLB Draft, becoming the first Belmont Abbey player to be drafted since 1972.

St. Louis Cardinals
He began his career as an infielder in the rookie leagues and then moved to the outfield in 2010 with the Palm Beach Cardinals. He began 2011 with the AA Springfield Cardinals, where he hit .319 in 93 games with 19 home runs and 62 RBI and was selected as a Texas League mid-season All-Star.

Los Angeles Dodgers
Castellanos was traded to the Dodgers for Rafael Furcal on July 31, 2011 and hit .322 for the Dodgers AA affiliate, the Chattanooga Lookouts in 32 games. He was added to the 40-man roster after the season to protect him from the Rule V Draft and was promoted to the AAA Albuquerque Isotopes to start 2012, where the Dodgers started playing him more at second base.

On May 31, 2012 he was called up to the Majors for the first time, replacing an injured Matt Kemp on the active roster. He made his debut as a defensive replacement in the eighth inning and was later hit by a pitch in his first at-bat. Castellanos started the next game against Colorado and recorded his first hit as an RBI triple. He hit his first Major League home run in his final at-bat of the season, on October 3 against Jean Machi of the San Francisco Giants. In the 2012 season, he played in 94 games for the Isotopes, hitting .326 with 17 homers and 52 RBI, and 16 games with the Dodgers, hitting .174.

In 2013, he only played in eight games in the Majors, with 3 hits in 18 at-bats, including a home run. At AAA Albuquerque, he was in 104 games and hit .257 with 19 homers and 61 RBI. The team abandoned the plan to turn him into an infielder that they had attempted the previous year and he played in the outfield the whole season.

Castellanos was designated for assignment by the Dodgers on October 17, 2013, and removed from the 40-man roster.

San Diego Padres
On October 23, 2013, Castellanos was traded to the Boston Red Sox in exchange for outfielder Jeremy Hazelbaker. On December 12, 2013, he was designated for assignment in order to make room for Mike Napoli on the roster. On December 23, 2013, he was claimed off waivers by the Texas Rangers. The Rangers designated him for assignment on March 5 to make room for Joe Saunders. On March 7, 2014, he was claimed off waivers by the San Diego Padres. He was designated for assignment on April 25, 2014. Castellanos cleared waivers this time and was ultimately outrighted to Triple-A El Paso.

New York Mets
On November 11, 2014, the Mets signed Castellanos to a minor league deal with an invite to spring training.

Yomiuri Giants
On July 28, 2015, Castellanos joined Yomiuri Giants in Tokyo as an outfielder and the 93 shirt number.

Colorado Rockies
On December 28, 2015, Castellanos signed a minor league deal with the Colorado Rockies.

Baltimore Orioles
On January 24, 2017, Castellanos signed a minor league deal with the Baltimore Orioles. He elected free agency on November 6, 2017.

Somerset Patriots
On March 21, 2018, Castellanos signed with the Somerset Patriots of the Atlantic League of Professional Baseball. He became a free agent following the 2018 season.

References

External links

1986 births
Living people
Baseball players from Florida
Los Angeles Dodgers players
Johnson City Cardinals players
Miami Diamantes players
Batavia Muckdogs players
Quad Cities River Bandits players
Palm Beach Cardinals players
Springfield Cardinals players
Chattanooga Lookouts players
Salt River Rafters players
Albuquerque Isotopes players
Tiburones de La Guaira players
American expatriate baseball players in Venezuela
El Paso Chihuahuas players
Major League Baseball outfielders
Miami Dade Sharks baseball players
Belmont Abbey Crusaders baseball players
Nippon Professional Baseball outfielders
Yomiuri Giants players
Las Vegas 51s players
Norfolk Tides players
Somerset Patriots players